The 2018 German motorcycle Grand Prix was the ninth round of the 2018 MotoGP season. It was held at the Sachsenring in Hohenstein-Ernstthal on 15 July 2018.

Classification

MotoGP
Franco Morbidelli was replaced by Stefan Bradl after the first practice session due to injury.

 Aleix Espargaró suffered a thoracic trauma following a crash in the warm-up session and was declared unfit to start the race.
 Mika Kallio suffered a knee injury in a crash during practice and withdrew from the event.

Moto2

 Jules Danilo suffered an electrical failure on the grid and failed to start the race.
 Niki Tuuli experienced pain from the finger injury suffered at the previous round at Assen and withdrew from the event.

Moto3

Championship standings after the race

MotoGP

Moto2

Moto3

Notes

References

German
Motorcycle Grand Prix
German motorcycle Grand Prix
German motorcycle Grand Prix